is a former Japanese football player.

Club statistics

References

External links

1985 births
Living people
Association football people from Tokyo
Japanese footballers
J1 League players
J2 League players
Japan Football League players
Kashiwa Reysol players
Ehime FC players
Zweigen Kanazawa players
Association football midfielders